Stella Ingrid Goldschlag, also known as Stella Kübler-Isaacksohn and Stella Kübler (10 July 1922 – 26 October 1994) was a German Jewish woman who collaborated with the Gestapo during World War II, operating around Berlin exposing and denouncing Berlin's underground Jews.

The number of people she betrayed or delivered to the Nazis is hard to calculate but is estimated to be anywhere from 600 to 3000.

Early life

She was born Stella Goldschlag and raised in Berlin as the only child in a middle-class, assimilated Jewish family. After the 1933 seizure of power by the Nazis, she, like other Jewish children, was forbidden to go to a state school by Nazi racial policies, so she attended the Goldschmidt School, set up by the local Jewish community. At school, she was known for her beauty and vivacity.

The family fell on hard times when the 1933 Law for the Restoration of the Professional Civil Service was used to purge Jews from positions of influence and her father, lost his job with the newsreel company Gaumont. Her parents attempted to leave Germany after Kristallnacht in 1938 to escape the Nazi regime, but were unable to gain visas for other countries. Goldschlag completed her education in 1938, training as a fashion designer at the School of Applied Art in Nürnbergerstraße.

Going underground and collaboration

In 1941, Goldschlag married a Jewish musician, Manfred Kübler. They had met when both were working as Jewish forced-labourers in a war plant in Berlin. In about 1942, when the large deportation programme of Berlin Jews into extermination camps began, she disappeared underground, using forged papers to pass as a non-Jew — owing to her blonde-haired, blue-eyed 'Aryan' appearance.

In the spring of 1943, Goldschlag and her parents were arrested by the Nazis and taken to Bessemerstrasse women's prison where she was interrogated and tortured; on July 10, 1943 (coincidentally her 21st birthday) she managed to escape briefly during a visit to the dentist but was quickly rearrested as she sought refuge in parents' home which was already being watched by the Gestapo and she was brutally tortured once more after being recaptured.

On August 24, 1943 the Bessemerstrasse prison was bombed during and air raid which damaged her cell and allowed her to escape yet again but this time she went to where her parents were being detained at the detention and assembly camp of Grosse Hamburger Strasse (the site of a Jewish cemetery that was desecrated and destroyed by the Nazis), intending on sharing their fate but she was taken back to Bessemerstrasse.

In order to avoid deportation of herself and her parents, she agreed to become a "catcher" for the Gestapo, hunting down Jews hiding as non-Jews (referred to as "submerged"). Goldschlag at first gave up names of Jewish fugitives only under torture, which happened for the first time after her failed escape attempt when she was captured with a list of names that included that of a Jewish man named Mikki Hellmann who had provided her with a forged passport and whom Goldschlag lured into a trap after which he was captured. However, she would later start to collaborate with the Gestapo more willingly.

After collaborating with Hellmann's arrest, Gestapo investigators found out that Goldschlag had also been in contact with a prominent passport forger named Samson Schönhaus who operated under the alias Günter Rogoff and who was involved with an extense Jewish-Catholic Polish resistance network and had provided at least 40 Jewish prisoners in the camp Goldschlag was kept with forged food ration cards, passports and various other identity documents. Thus, Gestapo officers were desperately looking for Schönhaus and, discovering Goldschlag's connection to him, and it was at this point that they offered her a more permanent arrangement collaborating with them and delivering Jewish fugitives to them: Schönhaus was never caught and survived the war, but Goldschlag's arrangement with the Nazis continued. She was promised that she and her parents would not be deported plus a reward of 300 Reichsmark for each Jew that she betrayed while she operated mostly around Berlin.

Goldschlag proceeded to comb Berlin for such Jews and, as she was familiar with a large number of Jewish people from her years at her segregated Jewish school, she was very successful at locating her former schoolmates and handing their information over to the Gestapo, while posing as a submerged herself. Some of Goldschlag's efforts to apprehend Jews in hiding included promising them food and accommodation, meanwhile turning them over to the Nazi authorities; she would also follow clues provided to her by the Gestapo. The data concerning the number of her victims varies, depending on different sources of information, from between 600 and 3,000 Jews. Goldschlag's charisma and striking good looks were a great advantage in her pursuit of underground Jews. The Nazis called her "blonde poison" while Jews in hiding knew her as the "Blonde Lorelei".

The Nazis would break their promise of sparing the lives of Goldschlag's parents. They were deported to the Theresienstadt concentration camp; from there they were later transported to Auschwitz and murdered. Goldschlag's husband, Manfred, was deported in 1943 to Auschwitz, along with his family. Goldschlag still continued her work for the Gestapo until March 1945. During that time, she met and married her second husband, Rolf Isaaksohn, on 29 October 1944. Isaksohn was a fellow Jewish collaborator with the Nazis known also as a Greifer ("catcher").

The end of the war and after

At the end of World War II, Goldschlag went into hiding. She was found and arrested by the Soviets in October 1945 and sentenced to ten years of hard labor. Following the completion of her sentence, she moved to West Berlin. There she was again tried and convicted, and sentenced to ten years' imprisonment. She did not have to serve the second sentence because of the time already served in the Soviet prison.

After the war, Goldschlag, according to author Irving Abrahamson, "convert[ed] to Christianity and bec[ame] an open anti-Semite".

Goldschlag supposedly committed suicide in 1994 by drowning in Freiburg; although other sources mention that she accidentally drowned, or that she committed suicide by leaping out of a window.

Personal life

Goldschlag was married five times: following the deportation of her first husband, Manfred Kübler, she married fellow Jewish collaborator and Greifer Rolf Isaaksohn on 29 October 1944, who was shot dead attempting to escape to Denmark as the Soviets advanced. After the war, she was married to three non-Jews, starting with Friedheim Schellenberg, followed by a cab driver twenty years her junior and finally a Berlin orchestra director who died in 1984.

Goldschlag's only child, Yvonne Meissl, was taken from her and became a nurse in Israel.

In biographies and fiction

Peter Wyden, a Berlin schoolmate whose family had been able to obtain US visas in 1937 and who later learned about Goldschlag's role as a "catcher" while he was working for the US Army, tracked down and interviewed Goldschlag in 1988, and wrote Stella, a 1992 biography of her.

Goldschlag is mentioned in The Forger, Cioma Schonhaus's 2004 account of living as an underground Jew in Berlin, and in Berlin at War by Roger Moorhouse (2010).

Fiction
In 2019, the German journalist Takis Würger published a novel based on Goldschlag's life, which was published by Carl Hanser Verlag. It received largely negative reviews. Critics described the work as "Holocaust kitsch", but it sold well.

Goldschlag is a minor character in the 2017 German docudrama, Die Unsichtbaren – Wir wollen leben (English title The Invisibles).

Goldschlag appears in Chris Petit's 2016 novel The Butchers of Berlin. Here, her actions as a "catcher" are in the background of the main story.

In the 2001 novel The Good German, the character Renate Naumann (named Lena Brandt in the 2006 film adaptation) is loosely based on Goldschlag. The book was adapted as the 2006 film titled The Good German directed by Steven Soderbergh and starring George Clooney, Cate Blanchett and Tobey Maguire.

References

Footnotes

Bibliography 
 
 
 

1922 births
1994 suicides
Converts to Christianity from Judaism
20th-century German Jews
German people of World War II
German prisoners and detainees
Gestapo agents
Holocaust perpetrators in Germany
Jewish collaborators with Nazi Germany
People from Berlin
Prisoners and detainees of the Soviet Union
Suicides by drowning in Germany
1994 deaths